Higher education is tertiary education leading to the award of an academic degree.

Higher Education may also refer to:

 Higher Education (journal), bimonthly academic journal
 Higher Education (novel), 1996 science fiction novel by Charles Sheffield and Jerry Pournelle
 "Higher Education" (Weeds episode), episode 7 of season 1 of the television show Weeds